Brigg was a county constituency centred on the town of Brigg in North Lincolnshire.  It returned one Member of Parliament (MP) to the House of Commons of the Parliament of the United Kingdom, elected by the first-past-the-post voting system.

The constituency was created for the 1885 general election, and abolished for the February 1974 general election when it was replaced by the new constituency of Brigg and Scunthorpe.

Boundaries
1885–1918: The Borough of Great Grimsby, the Sessional Divisions of Barton-upon-Humber, Brigg, and Winterton, and part of the Sessional Division of Grimsby.

1918–1950: The Urban Districts of Barton-upon-Humber, Brigg, Broughton, Brumby and Frodingham, Roxby-cum-Risby, Scunthorpe, and Winterton, and the Rural District of Glanford Brigg.

1950–1974: The Borough of Scunthorpe, the Urban Districts of Barton-upon-Humber and Brigg, and the Rural District of Glanford Brigg.

Members of Parliament

Elections

Elections in the 1880s

Elections in the 1890s

Elections in the 1900s

Elections in the 1910s 

General Election 1914–15:

Another General Election was required to take place before the end of 1915. The political parties had been making preparations for an election to take place and by the July 1914, the following candidates had been selected;
Liberal: Alfred Gelder
Unionist: Thomas Jewell Bennett

Elections in the 1920s

Elections in the 1930s

Elections in the 1940s

Elections in the 1950s

Elections in the 1960s

Elections in the 1970s

See also 
 1948 Brigg by-election

References 

Parliamentary constituencies in Lincolnshire (historic)
Borough of North Lincolnshire
Constituencies of the Parliament of the United Kingdom established in 1885
Constituencies of the Parliament of the United Kingdom disestablished in 1974
Brigg